Shirayeh (also Romanized as Shīrāyeh) is a village in Kenar Sar Rural District, Kuchesfahan District, Rasht County, Gilan Province, Iran. At the 2006 census, its population was 990, in 292 families.

References 

Populated places in Rasht County